Jessica Steen is a Canadian actress in both film and television, noted for her roles in Captain Power and the Soldiers of the Future, Homefront, Earth 2, Armageddon, Left Behind: World at War, NCIS, Flashpoint and the CBC series Heartland.

Personal life
Jessica Steen was born in Toronto, Ontario, the daughter of Joanna Noyes, an actress, and Jan Steen, a director and actor. She is of Dutch and Scottish ancestry.

Aside from her entertainment career, Steen is an environmentalist and animal rights supporter. She supports David Suzuki, the World Society for the Protection of Animals and the Western Canadian Wilderness Committee, among others. She is a certified diver, and is skilled at several circus arts – including stilt-walking, and fire-twirling.

Career
At the age of eight, Steen was cast in her first role in the Canadian children's television series, The Sunrunners, co-starring with her mother. In the 1986 TV movie Young Again, she portrayed Tracy Gordon, the daughter of a character portrayed by Lindsay Wagner.

In 1987, she was the only female regular on the syndicated series Captain Power and the Soldiers of the Future, which lasted one year. For her performance in the Captain Power episode, "Judgment", she was nominated for the Gemini Award in the "Best Performance by a Lead Actress in a Continuing Dramatic Role" category in 1988. In 1987, she played Tracy Steelgrave on THE WISEGUY. In 1989, Steen broke onto the big screen with the movie musical Sing. 

While in Toronto, Steen garnered roles on Canadian series and American made-for-TV movies until 1991, when she elected to move to New York City. Six weeks after arriving there, she was chosen to replace actress Noelle Beck, who was on maternity leave, on the soap opera Loving. Her portrayal of Patricia Alden Sowolsky Hartman McKenzie caught the attention of ABC's casting department and led to her being cast in the series Homefront. Set in a small Cleveland suburb immediately after World War II, Homefront was critically acclaimed for its writing, ensemble cast, and historical insights. The series lasted two seasons.

In 1994, she was cast as Dr. Julia Heller, a genetically enhanced doctor, in the NBC science fiction series Earth 2. While the show was canceled in 1995, the attention brought by the show allowed Steen to land guest appearances on other series, including The Outer Limits, ER, Murder One, The Pretender, The Practice, Due South, and Touched by an Angel. In 1994, she won the "Best Actress" Gemini Award, Canada's version of Emmy Awards, for her portrayal of Nora in the TV movie, Small Gifts. 

In 1997, she was cast as District Attorney Elizabeth Gardner in the movie Trial & Error, working with Jeff Daniels and Michael Richards, to whom she gave his first screen kiss. She prepared for the role with the help of a friend who was going through law school and by watching the closing arguments of Marcia Clark during the O. J. Simpson trial. Her performance earned a rave review from Roger Ebert on his syndicated show, Siskel & Ebert. 

Producer Jerry Bruckheimer recommended her for the role of the shuttle pilot in 1998's Armageddon because he remembered her portrayal of Cpl. Jennifer 'Pilot' Chase in Captain Power and the Soldiers of the Future. In 2004 Steen played Dr. Elizabeth Weir in "Lost City", the two-part finale of season 7 of Stargate SG-1. In Stargate Atlantis the part was instead played by Torri Higginson. She played lead roles in Slap Shot 2: Breaking the Ice and the Disney TV movies Smart House and Principal Takes a Holiday.

She played Myra Teal in a 2002 episode ("Mr. Monk and the Billionaire Mugger") of Monk. She played a recurring character on the CBS crime drama NCIS, that of Special Agent Paula Cassidy, from 2004–07. In the fall of 2007 she landed featured multi-episode roles on two Canadian series, jPod and Heartland, both based on popular books of the same names.

Between 2009 and 2012, Steen appeared in eleven episodes of the acclaimed Canadian TV police drama Flashpoint (which was also broadcast on CBS in the U.S) as Strategic Response Unit Constable Donna Sabine. She was nominated for a Gemini Award for her appearances in Clean Hands and The Perfect Family (Best Performance by an Actress in a Featured Supporting Role in a Dramatic Series) in 2010, ultimately losing to Catherine Disher of The Border. She was nominated for a Canadian Screen Award in the category of Best Performance in a Guest Role, Dramatic Series for Flashpoint episode A New Life in 2013. She lost to Gordon Pinsent for his guest performance in Republic of Doyle. 

She also played Sheriff's Deputy Kathleen Hudak in the Supernatural Season 1 episode "The Benders", a murdered cop/bodyguard in the Season 7 episode of CSI: Crime Scene Investigation (Toe Tags), and was cast as Commissioner Eva Braden in the dark comedy Bullet in the Face.

Between 2018 and 2020, Steen made several appearances in various Hallmark and Lifetime made-for-TV movies: A Midnight Kiss, Matching Hearts, Chateau Christmas, The Babysitter aka The Baby Monitor Murders, and Stolen by My Mother: The Kamiyah Mobley Story.

, Steen continues to appear in the supporting role of Lisa Stillman on the CBC television series Heartland—the longest-running one-hour scripted drama in the history of Canadian television. The character first appeared in the 2007 Season 1 episode "Breaking Free", married series patriarch Jack Bartlett in the 2014 Season 7 episode "Be Careful What You Wish For", and has been absent from roughly half of the episodes due to her world-traveling career as a horse breeder.

Filmography

References

External links

Actresses from Toronto
20th-century Canadian actresses
21st-century Canadian actresses
Canadian expatriate actresses in the United States
Canadian film actresses
Canadian television actresses
Canadian people of Dutch descent
Canadian people of Scottish descent
Living people
Year of birth missing (living people)